The Malaysia men's national field hockey team (nicknamed Speedy Tigers) represents Malaysia in international field hockey competitions. As of 16 October 2021, the team is ranked 10th in the world, and 2nd in Asia, by the International Hockey Federation. The governing body for the sports is the Malaysian Hockey Confederation.

Competition history
''A red box around the year indicates tournaments played within Malaysia and best results"

Summer Olympics

World Cup

Asian Games

Asia Cup

Asian Champions Trophy

Commonwealth Games

World League

Nations Cup

Champions Trophy

Champions Challenge

Champions Challenge II

Sultan Azlan Shah Cup

Hockey Asean Cup

Southeast Asian Games

Summer Youth Olympics

Junior team

Players

Current squad
The following 18 players were named on 29 December 2022 for the 2023 World Cup in Bhubaneswar and Rourkela, India from 13 to 29 January 2023.

Head coach: Arul Selvaraj

Recent call-ups
The following players have been called up for the national team in the last 12 months.

Records

Notable former players
 Azlan Misron
 Baljit Singh Charun
 Chairil Anwar
 Chua Boon Huat
 Gary Vernon Fidelis
 Harnahal Singh
 Zam Ariffin Ali Piah
 Ismail Bakri Mohd Noor
 Abdul Ranni Mohd Noor
 Jiwa Mohan
 Keevan Raj
 Kevin Nunis
 Kuhan Shanmuganathan
 Logan Raj
 Maninderjit Singh
 Nizam Nordin
 Mirnawan Nawawi
 Mohamad Bin Abdul Hadi
 Mohammad Zainal Bin Hussin
 Mohd Saiyuti Bin Abd Samat
 Nor Azlan Bakar
 Nor Saiful Zaini
 Peter van Huizen
 Poon Fook Loke
 Khairuddin Zainal
 R. Yogeswaran
 Rodhanizam Mat Radzi
 Roslan Jamaluddin
 Sarjit Singh
 Shahrun Nabil
 Stephen van Huizen
 Tai Beng Hai
 Wallace Tan
 Mazran Ramli
Soon Mustafa Karim
Kevinder Singh

Coaches

See also
Malaysia women's national field hockey team
Malaysia men's national under-21 field hockey team

References

External links

FIH profile

 
Asian men's national field hockey teams
national team
Men's sport in Malaysia